Myadaung Monastery (also known as the Queen's Monastery) was a Buddhist monastery built in 1885 under the patronage of Queen Supayalat. As a fine specimen of Burmese architecture, its conservation was ordered by Lord Curzon in December 1901.

See also
Atumashi Monastery
Shwenandaw Monastery
Taiktaw Monastery
Salin Monastery
Yaw Mingyi Monastery

Notes

References

Monasteries in Myanmar
Buddhist temples in Mandalay
19th-century Buddhist temples
Religious buildings and structures completed in 1885